Percival Reginald Lovett (1 August 1921 – 1982) was an English professional footballer who played as a goalkeeper. He made 13 appearances in the English Football League for Wrexham in 1947.

He also played non-league football for Hereford United.

References

1921 births
1982 deaths
English footballers
Association football goalkeepers
Everton F.C. players
Wrexham A.F.C. players
Hereford United F.C. players
English Football League players
Sportspeople from Shrewsbury